Pepsin A (pepsin, lactated pepsin, pepsin fortior, fundus-pepsin, elixir lactate of pepsin, P I, lactated pepsin elixir, P II, pepsin R, pepsin D) is an enzyme. This enzyme catalyses the following chemical reaction

 Preferential cleavage: hydrophobic, preferably aromatic, residues in P1 and P1' positions. Cleaves Phe1-Val, Gln4-His, Glu13-Ala, Ala14-Leu, Leu15-Tyr, Tyr16-Leu, Gly23-Phe, Phe24-Phe and Phe25-Tyr bonds in the B chain of insulin

The enzyme is a predominant endopeptidase in the gastric juice of vertebrates.

See also 
 Pepsin

References

External links 
 

EC 3.4.23